Nompumelelo "Mpumi" Nyandeni (born 19 August 1987) is a South African women's footballer and plays as a midfielder. She played for WFC Rossiyanka in Russia at a club level before returning to South Africa, where she now plays for JVW FC . Mpumi has represented the South Africa women's national football team 149 times, including at both the 2012 and 2016 Summer Olympics.

In 2010, she took part in a FIFA campaign for improving health through recreational football together with players such as Cristiano Ronaldo, Lionel Messi, and Didier Drogba.

Club career
Mpumi Nyandeni came through the Mpumalanga-based Detroit Ladies youth system. While a youth player, she competed with older players for positions in the senior side. She subsequently transferred to WFC Rossiyanka in the Russian Women's Football Championship. In 2011, she was selected by FIFA as one of a side of 11 international players to promote health issues among young people; others in the list included Lionel Messi and Cristiano Ronaldo. While at Rossiyanka, she met Refiloe Jane for the first time, who had been inspired by Nyandeni and would later also become a South African international.

International career
Nyandeni was called up to the South Africa women's national football team during the qualification matches for the 2012 Summer Olympics in London, United Kingdom. She was disappointed to be dropped from the squad, which she attributed to her fluctuating form, but was recalled and later played for South Africa in three matches at the Games itself. She has since become one of the most experienced players for the South African team, being one of four players alongside Janine van Wyk, Amanda Dlamini and Noko Matlou who have more than 100 caps each. She was selected once again for the squad for the 2016 Summer Olympics in Rio de Janeiro, Brazil.

International goals
Scores and results list South Africa's goal tally first

References

Living people
1987 births
Women's association football midfielders
South African women's soccer players
South Africa women's international soccer players
Footballers at the 2012 Summer Olympics
Olympic soccer players of South Africa
FIFA Century Club
Footballers at the 2016 Summer Olympics
Expatriate women's footballers in Russia
WFC Rossiyanka players
Women's association football forwards
South African expatriate soccer players